Red Cockroaches (Spanish: Cucarachas Rojas) is a Cuban film released in 2003. This feature film was the debut production of Miguel Coyula and was the result of a two-year effort on a tiny budget of $2,000. Shot entirely using a portable digital camcorder and edited on a home computer, Red Cockroaches is an example of DIY cinema. In its review, Variety called it a "A triumph of technology in the hands of a visionary with know-how..." It is the first of a planned trilogy which continues with Corazon Azul (Blue Heart).

Plot 
A young man meets a mysterious girl in the subway and gets romantically involved  with her, only to later discover that she might be his long lost sister.  Dark and atmospheric, the world the characters inhabit is an alternative New York City with bouts of Acid Rain and ruled by an omnipotent cloning company called DNA21. Cryptic in nature and merging several genres, mainly sci-fi and drama with sporadic dark humor and surrealist touches, Red Cockroaches’ morally ambiguous incest story has gathered as many fans as detractors making it a modern underground cult movie.

Visuals
Based on carefully planned storyboards, every time there is a cut in the film, it is to a new camera setup that hasn't been used before as opposed to traditional film language where the editor cuts back to a same shot during a scene. In the case of Red Cockroaches the influence of comic book storytelling is obvious.

Some reviewers have pointed that scene transitions and edits mimic the effect of a pop-up book.

Rather than attempting to make DV look like film, the colors were digitally manipulated to the extreme with the purpose of enhancing the atmosphere. This along with multiple layer composites generated the movie’s distinctive, often saturated look.

Awards
 GreenCine Online Film Festival, US, June 2005: Narrative Grand Prize
 San Francisco Fearless Tales, US, April 2005: Best Editing
 Festival Buenos Aires Rojo Sangre, Argentina, Nov 2004: Special Mention for Visual Concept
 SciencePlusFiction, Italy, Nov 2004: Special Mention
 Festival Cineplaza, Cuba, Oct 2004: Gran Premio Plaza
 Festival Cineplaza, Cuba, Oct 2004: Best Director
 Festival Cineplaza, Cuba, Oct 2004: Best Editing
 Festival Cineplaza, Cuba, Oct 2004: Best Sound
 Microcinema Fest, US, July 2004: Best of Fest
 Microcinema Fest, US, July 2004: Best Director
 Microcinema Fest, US, July 2004: Best Science Fiction Feature
 Microcinema Fest, US, July 2004: Best Actor
 Microcinema Fest, US, July 2004: Best Editing 
 Microcinema Fest, US, July 2004: Best FX
 Encuentro Nacional de Video, Cuba, June 2004: Best Editing 
 Encuentro Nacional de Video, Cuba, June 2004: Special Mention (Narrative)
 Encuentro Nacional de Video, Cuba, June 2004: Best Cinematography 
 Digital Independent Film Festival (DIFF), US, May 2004: Grand Jury Prize
 Muestra de Nuevos Realizadores, Cuba, Feb 2004: Special Award of the Jury
 Festival Almacen de la Imagen, Cuba, Oct 2003: Best Feature
 Festival Almacen de la Imagen, Cuba, Oct 2003: Best Editing 
 Festival Almacen de la Imagen, Cuba, Oct 2003: Cinema Award

See also 

 List of Cuban films

References

External links

 Red Cockroaches: The Official Website
 
 Red Cockroaches at Rotten Tomatoes
 Variety Review
 Digital Content Producer: Profile on Red Cockroaches

2003 films
Cuban drama films
Films set in the United States
2000s English-language films